Brando may refer to:

People
 Marlon Brando (1924–2004), American actor
 Christian Brando (1958–2008), son of Marlon Brando
 Miko C. Brando, Marlon Brando's son and Michael Jackson's one-time friend, bodyguard, and assistant
 Tarita Cheyenne Brando (1970–1995), daughter of Marlon Brando known as Cheyenne Brando
 Brando Eaton (born 1986), American actor

Places
Brändö, a municipality in Finland
Brändö, Helsinki, a part of the city of Helsinki
Brändö, Vaasa, a part of the city of Vaasa, Finland
Brando, Haute-Corse, a commune in France
Castel Brando, a medieval castle in the Veneto region of Italy

Art, entertainment, and media

Films
Brando (film), a 2007 documentary about Marlon Brando

Fictional characters
Brando Dingle, from the British soap opera Emmerdale
Dio Brando, villain of the anime and manga series JoJo's Bizarre Adventure
Dario Brando, father of Dio Brando from JoJo's Bizarre Adventure
Diego Brando, an alternate universe counterpart of Dio Brando from Steel Ball Run

Music and dance
Brando (singer), an American singer-songwriter best known for being the vocalist on the 2017 Loud Luxury song "Body"
Branle, a Baroque dance known as brando in Italian
The Brandos, a New York roots rock band

See also
Brando (surname)
Brandeau